Johann Werdmüller may refer to:

 Johann Conrad Werdmüller (1819–1892), Swiss illustrator and engraver
 Johann Rudolf Werdmüller (1639–1668), Swiss Baroque painter and medallist